Lee Ting Han (born  1990) is a Malaysian politician and lawyer who has served as the Member of the Johor State Legislative Assembly (MLA) for Paloh since March 2022.

Lee had studied at the SMK Permas Jaya, Johor Bahru (SMKPJ) from 2003-2009 before continuing his studies at the University of Malaya where he graduated with a bachelor's degree in law. He then continued his postgraduate study at University of Cambridge.

Before flying to the United Kingdom, Lee briefly worked at the Prime Minister's Department. A member of the Malaysian Chinese Association (MCA) which is also a composition of the Barisan Nasional (BN), he is working as the Special Function Officer to Wee Ka Siong, who has been serving as the Minister of Transport since 2020.

In the 2022 Johor state election, Lee contested as the BN candidate for Paloh and defeated 3 other candidates. He sworn as a Johor State Executive Councilor on 26 March 2022.

Election results

References

External links 
 Lee Ting Han on Facebook
 Lee Ting Han on Instagram

1990s births
Living people
Malaysian politicians of Chinese descent